Statistics of Austrian Football Bundesliga in the 1982–83 season.

Overview
It was contested by 16 teams, and SK Rapid Wien won the championship.

Teams and location

Teams of 1982–83 Austrian Football Bundesliga
1. Simmeringer
FC Admira/Wacker
Austria Salzburg
Austria Wien
Eisenstadt
First Vienna
Grazer AK
Kärnten
LASK
Neusiedl
Rapid Wien
Sturm Graz
Union Wels
VÖEST Linz
Wacker Innsbruck
Wiener Sport-Club

League standings

Results

References
Austria - List of final tables (RSSSF)

Austrian Football Bundesliga seasons
Austria
1982–83 in Austrian football